Sacramento Charter High School ("Sac High") is an independent public charter high school in the Oak Park neighborhood of Sacramento, California. Originally founded in 1856, Sacramento High is the second oldest public high school in California. In 2003, the school adopted its current form as a charter school within the Sacramento City Unified School District.

History
Founded in 1856, Sacramento High School moved several times. In 1922, construction began at its current location on 34th Street. It opened at this location in 1924 and continuously served the growing neighborhoods of Downtown Sacramento, Midtown, East Sacramento, River Park, College Greens, Tahoe Park and Oak Park until 2003.

The school was decommissioned as a standard public school by the SCUSD School Board in June 2003 due to low performance, over the objections of many students, parents and teachers.  The new charter high school, which opened in September 2003, kept the same school colors, purple and white, and the dragon mascot but not the Visual and Performing Arts Center (VAPAC) which had been one of the school's unique features for many years.  Sacramento Charter High School is governed by a private Board of Directors from St. Hope Public Schools.

Notable alumni

 Michael James Adams – aviator and NASA astronaut
 Herb Caen –  former gossip columnist for The X-Ray; went on to become Pulitzer Prize-winning columnist for the San Francisco Chronicle
 Eugene Chappie – Congressman 1981–1987
Stephon Clark – Black American man known for being killed by the police
 Ray Eames – American artist, designer, architect and filmmaker
 Ernesto Galarza – author, labor organizer and activist
 Marina Hantzis – former pornographic actress
 Hiram Johnson – former California governor
 Alva Johnston – author and Pulitzer Prize-winning writer for The New York Times
 Tim Kelly – President of the Alaska Senate 1989–1991
Mozzy – Rapper
 Aaron Peckham – founder of Urban Dictionary
 Rufus Reid – jazz bassist, educator, and composer
Cynthia Robinson – Rock and Roll Hall of Fame inductee, trumpeter and vocalist in Sly and The Family Stone
 Trent Smith – swimmer and public service

Notable athletes 
 Kevin Galloway – professional basketball player
 Kevin Johnson – former NBA player and Sacramento mayor
 Tommy Kono – three-time medalist in weightlifting
 Chase Tapley -Professional basketball player
 Josiah Turner – Professional basketball player
 Jim Breech - Professional football player

Notable figures in baseball 
 Cuno Barragan – former MLB catcher
 Brick Eldred – member of the Pacific Coast League Hall of Fame
 Tommy Glaviano - former MLB infielder
 Stan Hack - 16-year MLB third baseman
 Drungo Hazewood - former MLB outfielder
 Woodie Held – 12-year MLB outfielder
 Myril Hoag – 13-year MLB outfielder
 Mike Howard – former MLB outfielder
 Gordon Jones – 11-year MLB pitcher
 John McNamara – former minor-league catcher and major-league manager
 Jerry Royster – former MLB third baseman for five teams and current manager of the Lotte Giants, the Busan professional baseball team in South Korea
 Greg Sims – former MLB outfielder
 Matt Walbeck – Texas Rangers third-base coach and 11-year MLB catcher

Notable figures in football 
 Jim Breech – 14-year kicker for the Oakland Raiders and Cincinnati Bengals
 Ralph DeLoach – NFL player
 Kato Serwanga – five-year defensive back with the New England Patriots, Washington Redskins and the New York Giants
 Wasswa Serwanga – three-year defensive back with the San Francisco 49ers and Minnesota Vikings

References

External links/sources
Official site
Alumni association
The Baseball Cube

Educational institutions established in 1856
Educational institutions disestablished in 2003
High schools in Sacramento, California
Defunct schools in California
Charter high schools in California
1856 establishments in California
2003 disestablishments in California